Frederick R. Maxfield is a biochemist and Vladimir Horowitz and Wanda Toscanini Horowitz Distinguished Professor in Neuroscience, Biochemistry at Weill Cornell Medical College. He is one of the top highly cited researchers (h>100) according to webometrics.

References 

Living people
Year of birth missing (living people)
Cornell University faculty
American biochemists
Cornell University alumni
American neuroscientists